Stenodacma pyrrhodes is a moth of the family Pterophoridae. It has a wide range and has been recorded from Australia, India, Japan, South Africa, China, Nepal, Pakistan, Sri Lanka, Vietnam, Thailand and Korea. The species was first described by Edward Meyrick in 1889.

Taxonomy
Stenodacma pyrrhodes was placed as a synonym of Stenodacma wahlbergi (Zeller, 1851), but S. pyrrhodes was restored as a valid species by Ernst Arenberger in 2002.

References

External links
Trin Wiki
Japanese Moths
Pterophoridae aus Korea (Lepidoptera)

Moths of Australia
Oxyptilini
Moths described in 1889
Moths of Japan
Lepidoptera of South Africa
Moths of Asia
Taxa named by Edward Meyrick